Kenow Mountain is located in the Clark Range in the Flathead drainage of British Columbia.

References

Two-thousanders of British Columbia
Canadian Rockies
Kootenay Land District